Arthur Raine Daly (1833 – 1 February 1898) was an English first-class cricketer active 1866 who played for Middlesex in a single match only. He was born in Paddington and died in Marylebone

References

1833 births
1898 deaths
English cricketers
Middlesex cricketers